Oscar Ramírez (born 29 July 1961) is a Bolivian footballer. He played in eight matches for the Bolivia national football team from 1985 to 1987. He was also part of Bolivia's squad for the 1987 Copa América tournament.

References

External links
 

1961 births
Living people
Bolivian footballers
Bolivia international footballers
Place of birth missing (living people)
Association football midfielders
Club Deportivo Guabirá managers